This is a list of lighthouses in Turks and Caicos Islands.

Lighthouses

See also
 Lists of lighthouses and lightvessels

References

External links

 

Turk and Caicos Islands
Lighthouses